Samuel "Sam" Von Einem (born 21 June 1995) is an Australian Paralympic table tennis player. Von Einem has represented Australia in table tennis since 2011. He represented Australia at the 2016 Rio Paralympics and 2020 Tokyo Paralympics, where he won silver medals in the Men's Class 11. At  Rio Paralympics, he became Australia's first male table tennis medalist since Terry Biggs won gold in 1984.

Personal
Von Einem was born on 21 June 1995 and is from Glengowrie, SA. Diagnosed with autism, he started playing tennis when he was five years old. In 2003, his family moved to Abu Dhabi where the hot climate helped him find his new passion of playing table tennis indoors. Von Einem has completed a Cert IV in Bookkeeping at TAFE SA – Adelaide City.

Table tennis
Von Einem is a class 11 table tennis player, which means he competes in a division of players with an intellectual disability. Von Einem began competing in table tennis in 2007 and made his first international debut in 2011 when he was selected to represent Australia at the World Junior Circuit event held in Dedeo, Guam. Aged, 16 Von Einem won a silver medal as part of the Under 18 Junior Team. In 2015, Von Einem was confirmed as a class 11 athlete which made him eligible for international ranking points and the Paralympic Games. Not long after receiving this confirmation, Von Einem achieved a new career highlight where he competed in the men's singles at the Spanish Para Open in June 2015. Von Einem held off a strong French opponent to win gold in the Class 11.

At the 2016 Rio Paralympics, he won the silver medal in the Men's Class 11. He lost to world number one Florian Van Acker 2-3 (8-11, 18–16, 13–11, 5–11, 8–11).

At the 2020 Tokyo Paralympics, he won the silver medal in the Men's Class 11. He lost to Péter Pálos  2–3 (11–6, 7–11, 11–7, 6–11, 9–11).

Other achievements include :

 Winner of Class 11 singles at the 2013 Oceania Para Regionals
 Bronze medal in Class 11 singles at both the 2014 Hungary & Italian Para Open
 Silver medal in Class 11 teams with Rory Carroll at the 2014 Italian Para Open
 Open Singles and Class 11 Singles winner at the 2014 National AWD Championships

He took home bronze in the Men's Class 11 at the 2018 Para Table Tennis World Championships in Lasko-Celje, Slovenia.

Von Einem trains at Woodville District Table Tennis Club and is coached by David Lowe.

Recognition
He has won the Table Tennis Australia Para Athlete of the Year Award in 2014 and 2016.

References

External links

1995 births
Intellectual Disability category Paralympic competitors
Living people
Medalists at the 2016 Summer Paralympics
Paralympic silver medalists for Australia
Paralympic table tennis players of Australia
Sportspeople with autism
Sportsmen from South Australia
Table tennis players at the 2016 Summer Paralympics
Table tennis players at the 2020 Summer Paralympics
Australian people of German descent
Australian expatriate sportspeople in the United Arab Emirates
Sportspeople with intellectual disability
Paralympic medalists in table tennis